Mae Tha is a tambon (subdistrict) of Mae On District, in Chiang Mai Province, Thailand. In 2018 it had a total population of 4,514 people.

Administration

Central administration
The tambon is subdivided into 7 administrative villages (muban).

Local administration
The whole area of the subdistrict is covered by the subdistrict administrative organization (SAO) Mae Tha (องค์การบริหารส่วนตำบลแม่ทา).

References

External links
Thaitambon.com on Mae Tha

Tambon of Chiang Mai province
Populated places in Chiang Mai province